Balltown Road is a street of some 10 miles (16 km), running almost exactly N-S, that follows parts of:
New York State Route 146, crossing the Mohawk River at the Aqueduct Bridge
 New York State Route 914T (not marked)

The road begins in Schenectady County and enters Saratoga County when it crosses the Mohawk.
Transportation in Saratoga County, New York
Transportation in Schenectady County, New York